May refer to:

 Sixtine Vulgate, first published in 1590
 Sixto-Clementine Vulgate, first published in 1592
 Benedictine Vulgate, also called Roman Vulgate, published between 1926 and 1995
 Nova Vulgata, first published in 1979